"Achy Breaky Song" is a country song by American song parodist "Weird Al" Yankovic, released on his album Alapalooza, parodying the song "Achy Breaky Heart" by Billy Ray Cyrus. The song details a disgruntled listener's disdain for the song ("Don't play that song, that achy breaky song..."), as well as several alternatives he would rather endure, rather than having to listen to it anymore. These even include physical torture such as being "tie[d]... to a chair and kick[ed]... down the stairs".

"Achy Breaky Song" was Yankovic's first single to get considerable airplay on country radio stations. The liner notes for the album Alapalooza state that "All songwriting proceeds from Achy Breaky Song will be donated to the United Cerebral Palsy Association." Yankovic stated that this was done because since the song itself was so "mean-spirited" he thought that he might as well donate the money earned to a charitable cause.

The song references Donny & Marie, Barry Manilow, New Kids on the Block, the Village People, Vanilla Ice, the Bee Gees, Debby Boone, ABBA, Slim Whitman, Gheorghe Zamfir, Yoko Ono and Tiffany as artists the narrator would rather listen to than "Achy Breaky Heart." Yankovic had previously recorded parodies of songs by New Kids on the Block and Tiffany.

18 years later, Yankovic parodied Cyrus' daughter Miley on the 2011 album Alpocalypse with the song "Party in the CIA", also including references to torture in the lyrics, a parody of her song "Party in the U.S.A.".

References

"Weird Al" Yankovic songs
Songs with lyrics by "Weird Al" Yankovic
1993 singles
1993 songs
Charity singles
Songs about country music
Scotti Brothers Records singles